Tactoids are liquid crystal microdomains nucleated in isotropic phases, which can be distinguished as spherical or spindle-shaped birefringent microdroplets under polarized light microscopy. Tactoids are a transition state between isotropic and macroscopic liquid crystalline phases. The first observation of tactoids was made by Zocher in 1925, when he studied the nematic phase formed in vanadium pentoxide sols. After that, tactoids have been found in the phase transition processes in many lyotropic liquid crystalline substances, such as tobacco mosaic virus, polypeptides, and cellulose nanocrystals.

In biology 
It has been shown that filamin causes actin to condense into tactoids.

References

Biochemistry
Chemical properties
Liquid crystals